Barebox is a primary boot loader used in embedded devices. It is free software under the GPL-2.0-only license. It is available for a number of different computer architectures, including ARM, x86, MIPS and RISC-V.

History 
The Barebox project began in July 2007 as u-boot-v2, as it was derived from Das U-Boot, but with heavier borrowings from Linux like similar utilities and with a more Linux-like coding style.

See also 

 Das U-Boot
 Comparison of boot loaders

References

External links 
 
 ELCE2009 slides
 ELCE2012 slides

Firmware
Software related to embedded Linux
Free boot loaders